John Bowker may refer to:
John Bowker (theologian) (born 1935), English Anglican priest and pioneering scholar of religious studies
John Bowker (baseball) (born 1983), American professional baseball player